Duelm is an unincorporated community in St. George Township, Benton County, Minnesota, United States, near Foley.  The community is located along Duelm Road near 110th Avenue.  Stoney Brook flows through the community.

State Highways 25 (MN 25) and 95 (MN 95) are also in the immediate area.

Duelm was originally settled chiefly by Germans from the town Dülmen.

References

Unincorporated communities in Benton County, Minnesota
Unincorporated communities in Minnesota